The men's road race C1–3 cycling event at the 2012 Summer Paralympics took place on 6 September at Brands Hatch. Forty riders competed. The race distance was 64 km.

Results
DNF = Did Not Finish

Men's road race C1-3